In music, pitch-class interval may refer to:
ordered pitch-class interval
unordered pitch-class interval